The 2018 Tiburon Challenger was a professional tennis tournament played on outdoor hard courts. It was the twelfth edition of the tournament which was part of the 2018 ATP Challenger Tour. It took place in Tiburon, United States between 24 and 30 September 2018.

Singles main draw entrants

Seeds

 1 Rankings are as of September 17, 2018.

Other entrants
The following players received wildcards into the singles main draw:
  JC Aragone
  Tom Fawcett
  Brandon Holt
  Tommy Paul

The following player received entry into the singles main draw as a special exempt:
  Mikael Torpegaard

The following player received entry into the singles main draw as an alternate:
  James Duckworth

The following players received entry from the qualifying draw:
  Steven Diez
  Cem İlkel
  Roberto Ortega Olmedo
  Alexander Sarkissian

Champions

Singles

 Michael Mmoh def.  Marcel Granollers 6–3, 7–5.

Doubles

 Hans Hach Verdugo /  Luke Saville def.  Gerard Granollers /  Pedro Martínez 6–3, 6–2.

References

Tiburon Challenger
2018
2018 in American tennis
2018 in sports in California